Gordon Muir Campbell,  (born January 12, 1948) is a retired Canadian diplomat and politician who was the 35th mayor of Vancouver from 1986 to 1993 and the 34th premier of British Columbia from 2001 to 2011.

He was the leader of the British Columbia Liberal Party from 1993 to 2011. From 2011 to 2016, he served as Canadian High Commissioner to the United Kingdom and Canada's representative to the Ismaili Imamat from 2014 to 2016.

Early life
Campbell was born in Vancouver, British Columbia. His father, Charles Gordon (Chargo) Campbell, was a physician and an assistant dean of medicine at the University of British Columbia, until his suicide in 1961, when Gordon was 13. His mother Peg was a kindergarten assistant at University Hill Elementary School. The couple had four children. Gordon grew up in the West Point Grey neighbourhood of Vancouver and went to Stride Elementary, and University Hill Secondary School where he was student council president.  He was accepted by Dartmouth College, an Ivy League institution in New Hampshire; he had received a scholarship and a job offer so he could afford the fees.

Later life 
Campbell intended to study medicine but three English professors persuaded him to shift his focus to English and urban management. He earned a Bachelor of Arts degree in English. At Dartmouth, in 1969, Campbell received a $1,500 Urban Studies Fellowship that made it possible for him to work in Vancouver's city government where he met Art Phillips, a TEAM city councilor and future mayor of Vancouver.

After graduating from university that year, Campbell and Nancy Chipperfield were married in New Westminster on July 4, 1970. Under the Canadian University Service Overseas (CUSO) program, they went to Nigeria to teach. There he coached basketball and track and field and launched literacy initiatives. Stanford  accepted Campbell to pursue a master's degree in education, but the couple returned to Vancouver instead where Campbell entered law school at the University of British Columbia (UBC) and Nancy completed her education degree. Campbell's law education was short-lived; he soon returned to the City of Vancouver to work for Art Phillips on his mayoral campaign. When Phillips was elected in 1972, Campbell became his executive assistant, a job he held until 1976.

At 28 years old, he left Mayor Phillips's office and went to work for Marathon Realty as a project manager. In 1976, Geoffrey, the Campbells' first child, was born. In 1978, the Campbells bought a house in Point Grey, which was their home for the next 26 years. From 1975 to 1978, he pursued a Master of Business Administration degree at Simon Fraser University. In 1979, Nancy Campbell gave birth to their second child, Nicholas.

In 1981, Campbell left Marathon Realty and started his own business, Citycore Development Corporation. Despite the economic slowdown that affected Canada that year, his company was successful and constructed several buildings in Vancouver.

After a two-year absence from civic political activities, Campbell became involved in the mayoral campaign of May Brown and was an active supporter of the Downtown Stadium for Vancouver Committee. Although Brown was unsuccessful, Campbell and the committee continued promoting the stadium to revitalize False Creek, which at the time was polluted industrial land. The committee was eventually successful, as Premier Bill Bennett announced the Downtown Stadium project in 1980.

Vancouver Councillor and Mayor
Campbell was elected to Vancouver City Council in 1984 as a member of the Non-Partisan Association. He was then elected as mayor of Vancouver for three successive terms from 1986 to 1993. Notable events in civic politics during that period included the development of the Expo Lands, the re-development of Yaletown, and the foundation of the Coal Harbour residential area. One of the most significant projects of his term was the construction of the new Vancouver Public Library. He also served as chair of the Greater Vancouver Regional District and president of the Union of British Columbia Municipalities.

Liberal leader
Campbell became leader of the British Columbia Liberal Party in 1993 in a three-way race with Gordon Gibson, Jr. and Gordon Wilson, the incumbent party leader, who had lost the confidence of his party. He was elected to the Legislative Assembly the next year in a by-election in Vancouver-Quilchena.

In the 1996 campaign, Campbell was elected to the Vancouver-Point Grey riding, which he held until 2010. The Liberals entered the election leading in the polls because of a fundraising scandal in the New Democratic Party (NDP). His party gained 16 seats and won a slight plurality of the popular vote, but the NDP retained enough seats to continue as the majority government. He stayed on as leader of the Opposition, opposing NDP premiers Glen Clark, Dan Miller and Ujjal Dosanjh.

In May 2000, Campbell, along with Michael de Jong and Geoffrey Plant, brought a court case against the Nisga'a Nation, the Attorney General of Canada and the Attorney General of British Columbia, parties to the first modern day Aboriginal Treaty in British Columbia, known as the Nisga'a Final Agreement. He and the other plaintiffs claimed the treaty signed with the Nisga'a Nation was "in part inconsistent with the Constitution of Canada and therefore in part of no force and effect". However, Justice Williamson dismissed the application, judging that the enacting legislation did "establish a treaty as contemplated by Section 35 of the Constitution Act, 1982. The legislation and the Treaty are constitutionally valid."

Premier Glen Clark's government was beset by controversy, difficult economic and fiscal conditions, attacks on the NDP's building of the Fast Ferries and charges against Clark in relation to casino licensing, known as Casinogate. (Clark was eventually vindicated, though resigned his post because of the investigation.) In the BC election of 2001, Campbell's Liberals defeated the two-term NDP incumbents, taking 77 of 79 seats in the legislature. This was the largest majority of seats and the second-largest majority of the popular vote in BC history.

Premier (2001−2011)

First term

Tax
In 2001, Campbell campaigned on a promise to reduce income taxes significantly to stimulate the economy.  A day after taking office, he reduced personal income tax for all taxpayers by 25 per cent across every tax bracket. The government also introduced reductions in the corporate income tax, and eliminated the Corporation Capital Tax.

Spending
To finance the tax cuts and to balance the provincial budget, Campbell's first term was also noted for several measures of fiscal austerity such as reductions in welfare rolls and some social services, deregulation, sale of government assets (in particular the ferries built by the previous government during the Fast Ferry Scandal), reducing the size of the civil service, and closing government offices in certain areas.

BC Rail 
In 2003, Campbell announced the sale of BC Rail, a publicly owned rail corporation, to the Canadian National Railway. This occurred even though he had made a campaign promise not to sell the company during the 2001 British Columbia election. In 1996, he had lost an election after promising to sell BC Rail, leading some to allege that he had hidden his true plans to get elected in 2001, and "went back to his original plan" after winning the election in 2001. This sale was condemned as unfair by the losing bidders, and triggered charges based in information found during police raids on cabinet offices in a drug-related investigation in what is known as the BC Legislature Raids.

Education
The Campbell government passed legislation in August 2001 declaring education as an essential service, therefore making it illegal for educators to go on strike. This fulfilled a platform promise made in the election campaign.

The government embarked upon the largest expansion of BC's post-secondary education system since the foundation of Simon Fraser University in 1965. In 2004, the government announced that 25,000 new post-secondary places would be established between 2004 and 2010.

The Campbell government also lifted the six-year-long tuition fee freeze that was placed on BC universities and colleges by the previous NDP government. In 2005 a tuition limit policy was put in place, capping increases at the rate of inflation.

Environmental
Campbell made significant changes, including new Environmental Assessment Legislation, as well as controversial new aquaculture policies on salmon farming. In November 2002, His government passed the Forest and Range Practices Act which reversed many of the regulations previously introduced by the former New Democrat government.

First Nations

During the 2001 election, the BC Liberals also campaigned on a promise to hold a consultative referendum seeking a mandate from the general public to negotiate treaties with First Nations. In the spring of 2002, the government held the referendum.

The referendum, led by attorney general Geoff Plant, proposed eight questions that voters were asked to either support or oppose. Critics claimed the phrasing was flawed or biased toward a predetermined response. While some critics, especially First Nations and religious groups, called for a boycott of the referendum, by the May 15 deadline almost 800,000 British Columbians had cast their ballots. Critics called for a boycott of the referendum and First Nations groups collected as many ballots as possible so that they might be destroyed publicly.

Of the ballots that were returned, over 80 per cent of participating voters agreed to all eight proposed principles. Treaty negotiations resumed.

In the lead-up to the 2005 election, Campbell discussed opening up a New Relationship with Aboriginal People. This position was directly opposite to his view of aboriginal treaties pursued in the 2000 Nisga'a Final Treaty court case, discussed above. The "New Relationship" became the foundation for agreements in principle that were made during the second term, but ultimately rejected by the membership of the First Nations involved.

Health care
In 2004, Campbell imposed an unprecedented 15% pay cut to health care employees. Early in its first term, without consulting labour unions, his government passed legislation (Bill 29, the Health and Social Services Delivery Improvement Act) that unilaterally amended labour agreements and required health authorities to contract out positions when savings could be predicted. This led to the privatization of more than 8,000 healthcare jobs. These changes met resistance from many health care workers and resulted in a strike by some of them. A court order and amendments by the government to parts of the legislation ended the strike. The unions took the issue to the Supreme Court of Canada, which ruled in 2007 that the Act violated "good faith" requirements for collective bargaining.

The Campbell government increased health funding by $3 billion during its first term in office to help meet the demand at hand and to increase wages for some health professionals. As well, they increased the number of new nurse training spaces by 2,500, an increase of 62 percent. At the same time, it nearly doubled the doctors in training and opened new medical training facilities in Victoria and Prince George.

Wage rates for doctors and nurses increased in the Campbell government's first term. Nurses received a 23.5 percent raise while doctors received a 20.6 percent raise after arbitration.  Doctors had threatened to go on strike because of the original Campbell plan to slash their fees, which was seen as a breach of contract, with the dispute being sent to arbitration.

Impaired driving

In January 2003, after visiting broadcaster Fred Latremouille, Campbell was arrested and pleaded no contest for driving under the influence of alcohol while vacationing in Hawaii. According to court records, Campbell's blood-alcohol level was more than twice the legal limit.  In Hawaii, drunk driving is only a misdemeanour, whereas in Canada it is a Criminal Code offence.  As is customary in the United States, Campbell's mugshot was provided to the media by Hawaii police. The image has proved to be a lasting personal embarrassment, frequently used by detractors and opponents. Campbell was fined $913 (US) and the court ordered him to take part in a substance abuse program, and to be assessed for alcoholism.

A national anti-drinking and driving group, Mothers Against Drunk Driving (MADD) Canada called for Campbell to resign.  Campbell refused.

Minimum wage
On November 1, 2001, the Campbell BC Liberals honoured the previous NDP government's legislation to increase the minimum wage to $8.00 per hour from $7.60, while at the same time authority was given so new entrants into the labour force could be paid $6 per hour, 25% lower than the minimum wage.  In 2010, British Columbia had the lowest minimum wage amongst the 13 provinces and territories. Campbell's successor, Christy Clark, announced that the minimum wage would increase in three stages to begin on May 1, 2011.

2010 Winter Olympics
British Columbia won the right to host the 2010 Winter Olympics on July 2, 2003.  This was a joint Winter Olympics bid by Vancouver and the ski resort of Whistler. Campbell attended the final presentations in Prague, the Czech Republic.

On February 12, 2010, Campbell was in attendance at the opening ceremony for the 2010 Winter Olympics in Vancouver and attended events during the games and was present at the closing ceremony.

On April 23, 2010, Campbell received the Olympic Order from the Canadian Olympic Committee for being a dedicated proponent of the Olympic Movement.

Second term
In the May 17, 2005, election, Campbell and the BC Liberals won a second majority government with a reduced majority.

Economy
430,000 new jobs had been created in B.C. since December 2001, the best job creation record in Canada at the time. In 2007, the economy created 70,800 more jobs, almost all full-time positions. By Spring 2007, unemployment had fallen to 4.0%, the lowest rate in 30 years. However, 40,300 jobs were lost in 2008, mostly in December (35,100), and the unemployment rates sat at 7.8% as of July 2009, the same level they were at in July 2001.

Education
On October 7, 2005, following the successive imposition of contracts on BC teachers, British Columbia's teachers began an indefinite walk-out. Campbell having made striking illegal for teachers, educators referred to this as an act of civil disobedience. Despite fines and contempt charges, the teachers' walk-out lasted two weeks, and threatened to culminate in a general strike across the province.

Environmental
In 2008, Premier Campbell's government developed and entrenched in law the Climate Action Plan. The Plan is claimed by the government to be one of the most progressive plans to address greenhouse gas emissions in North America, due in part to the revenue-neutral carbon tax.

Gordon Campbell told Tim Flannery that he introduced the carbon tax in British Columbia after reading his book The Weather Makers (2005).

First Nations
The Campbell government attempted to negotiate treaties with a number of First Nations in its second term.  Final agreements in principle were signed with the Tsawwassen First Nation, Maa-nulth Treaty Society, and Lheidli T’enneh First Nations.  The Tsawwassen Treaty was passed by the band's membership in a heavily contested and divisive referendum but came into effect on April 3, 2009.

The Maa-nulth Treaty, which covers a group of Nuu-chah-nulth band governments, is pending ratification by the federal government while the Lheidli-T'enneh Treaty was rejected in the referendum held by that band.

Health care
The Campbell government launched the Conversation on Health, a province-wide consultation with British Columbians on their health care to lay the groundwork for changes to the principles of the Canada Health Act that were presented in the Fall of 2007.

Third term

His government were re-elected in the May 12, 2009, election.  Their share of total seats remained almost unchanged, as they won 49 seats in a new expanded 85-seat legislature.

BC Rail e-mail controversy
Some five years after the BC Legislature Raids, controversy arose when it was revealed that e-mails among Campbell, his staff, and other cabinet ministers may not have been deleted years ago as first claimed.  An affidavit filed by Rosemarie Hayes, the B.C. government's manager in charge of information services, suggested that copies of the e-mails may have existed as recently as May 2009, but it was ordered that they be destroyed at that time.

On July 20, 2009, the Supreme Court of British Columbia judge conducting the Basi-Virk trial, Madam Justice Elizabeth Bennett, ordered Campbell and other top officials to turn over their e-mail records to the court by August 17.  These were never located nor surrendered to the Court.

HST controversy
On July 23, 2009, Campbell announced British Columbia would move towards a Harmonized Sales Tax, or HST.  The new 12% sales tax would combine and replace the previous 5% Goods and Services Tax and 7% Provincial Sales Tax.  The announcement was met with strong opposition from political opponents, news media, and opposition from most members of the public. However, the proposed tax received a positive reaction from the business community, strong supporters of the BC Liberals. Much of the opposition stemmed from Campbell's perceived dishonesty about the HST as his government had said it was not on their radar prior to the election despite leaked emails revealing it was, and that it equated to a tax hike for several sectors.

On August 24, representatives from the retail, resource, and film industries held a news conference to speak out in favour of harmonizing BC's sales taxes. In addition, sales tax harmonization has been hailed by the C.D. Howe Institute, a think tank, as being "crucial for B.C to maintain its economic competitiveness." David Docherty, a political science professor at Wilfrid Laurier University, noted that anti-HST sentiment was evident in left-wing populist groups who viewed it as "regressive" and those on the right who "hate all taxes". Polls consistently showed ...opposition to the HST in BC at "82 to 85 percent".
"Shortly after the HST announcement, Ipsos Reid reported 85 percent opposition in British Columbia, dropping only slightly to 82 percent a few months
later."

On June 11, 2010, Blair Lekstrom resigned as BC's Minister of Energy, Mines and Petroleum Resources, saying he was leaving both the cabinet and the caucus over a fundamental disagreement with the BC Liberals on the harmonized sales tax. He told The Canadian Press: "It was a tough decision but it had to be made. Fundamentally, the HST is it. The people I represent say  ... we want you to put the brakes on the HST." His constituency bordered on Alberta, which had no provincial sales tax and businesses were concerned they would lose sales.

A freedom of information request came to light on September 1, 2010, revealing that the BC Liberals had formed HST-related plans prior to the 2009 election—contrary to their statements on the subject.

Resignation
On November 3, 2010, Campbell made a televised address to the public announcing his intention to resign as Premier of British Columbia. The announcement was made after months of strong political opposition to the implementation of the HST, which saw Campbell's approval rating fall to only 9%, according to an Angus Reid poll, and led to rumours that he has lost support of some members of his cabinet. Another factor in his resignation was the ongoing BC Rail Scandal trial in which the Premier and other members of his cabinet and staff were due to face embarrassing cross-examination in relation to the Basi-Virk trial, which was called to a halt with  plea bargain around the same time. On December 5, 2010, while answering questions from reporters, he "hinted strongly" that he will not stay on as an MLA after his successor as Liberal leader is chosen in February, according to Rod Mickleburgh of The Globe and Mail.
Campbell resigned as premier on March 14, 2011; he was succeeded by Christy Clark.

High Commissioner to the UK

 
In late June 2011 it was reported that Campbell was to be named Canadian High Commissioner to the United Kingdom. On August 15, 2011, Campbell was formally announced to succeed the post. On September 15, 2011, Campbell officially became the Canadian High Commissioner in London. He represented Canadian interests throughout Britain until his term ended in 2016.

Campbell was shortlisted for the Grassroot Diplomat Initiative Award in 2015 for his work on business partnership as the High Commissioner of Canada, and he remains in the directory of the Grassroot Diplomat Who's Who publication.

In January 2019, a former High Commission employee, Judith Prins, filed a sexual assault complaint with Scotland Yard alleging that Campbell groped her in 2013. A spokesperson for Campbell denied the allegation, saying the complaint was investigated and dismissed at the time. In September 2020, details emerged of a civil suit filed by Prins naming Campbell and the Government of Canada as defendants. She is seeking damages for anxiety, stress and lost income. Campbell responded to this news saying: "This has been settled once before, more than five years ago now. It was dealt with fully."

Honours
On September 2, 2011, it was announced that Campbell would receive the Order of British Columbia, the second Premier to be a recipient. Some believed his nomination contravened the legislation that prevented an elected official from being appointed while holding office. However, on September 7, 2011, Lance S. G. Finch, the Chief Justice of British Columbia and chair of the Order of BC Advisory Council declared that although his nomination package was received on March 10, 2011 (four days before his resignation as Premier), Campbell was appointed to the Order on September 2, 2011 at which time he was not an elected MLA.

In 2014, Thompson Rivers University gave Campbell the Honorary degree of Doctor of Laws for his contributions to the founding of their newly opened law school.

He was awarded the Queen Elizabeth II Golden Jubilee Medal in 2002 and the Queen Elizabeth II Diamond Jubilee Medal in 2012.

Election results (partial)

References

External links
 

1948 births
20th-century Canadian politicians
21st-century Canadian politicians
British Columbia Liberal Party MLAs
Businesspeople from Vancouver
Canadian Anglicans
Canadian expatriates in Nigeria
Canadian real estate businesspeople
Canadian schoolteachers
Dartmouth College alumni
High Commissioners of Canada to the United Kingdom
Leaders of the British Columbia Liberal Party
Living people
Mayors of Vancouver
Members of the Executive Council of British Columbia
Members of the Order of British Columbia
Officers of the Order of Canada
Premiers of British Columbia
Simon Fraser University alumni